Stara Rafalivka is a village in Varash Raion, Rivne Oblast, Ukraine, but was formerly administered within Volodymyrets Raion.  In 2001 the community had 435 residents. Postal code — 34354. KOATUU code — 5620889301.

It was the site of a gruesome massacre (60 people, including children, were killed) by Soviet partisans during World War II.

References 

Volhynian Governorate
Villages in Varash Raion